Parascutigera is a genus of centipedes in the family Scutigeridae. It was described by German myriapodologist Karl Wilhelm Verhoeff in 1904.

Species
There are about 12 valid species, including:

 Parascutigera aequispinata Ribaut, 1923
 Parascutigera alveolus Ribaut, 1923
 Parascutigera dahli Verhoeff, 1904
 Parascutigera festiva Ribaut, 1923
 Parascutigera guttata Verhoeff, 1925
 Parascutigera latericia Ribaut, 1923
 Parascutigera lembehna Chamberlin, 1944
 Parascutigera montana Verhoeff, 1937
 Parascutigera nubila Ribaut, 1923
 Parascutigera peluda Edgecombe, 2009
 Parascutigera philippina Chamberlin, 1921
 Parascutigera sphinx Verhoeff, 1925

References

 

 
 
Centipede genera
Animals described in 1904
Taxa named by Karl Wilhelm Verhoeff